Jon Erickson may refer to:

Jon David Erickson (born 1969), ecological economist
Jon Erickson, author of Hacking: The Art of Exploitation

See also
John Erickson (disambiguation)
John Ericson (born 1926), German-American actor